Centre Hall is a borough in Centre County, Pennsylvania, United States. It is located in Penns Valley and is part of the State College, Pennsylvania Metropolitan Statistical Area. The population was 1,265 at the 2010 census, which is a 17.2% increase from the 2000 census.

Centre Hall was so named on account of its location near the geographical center of Penns Valley.

Geography
Centre Hall is located at  (40.844287, -77.684615).

Events

Centre Hall hosts the Centre County Grange Encampment and Fair, known to most as the "Grange Fair". The Fair attracts tens of thousands of people during its run, and takes place the last full Thursday to Thursday week in August annually. It is one of the few remaining tenting fairs in the United States, with nearly a thousand "army-style" tents laid in rows throughout the grounds. In 1874, Leonard Rhone, a local farmer and activist, urged that members of the local Granges that he had founded to invite their neighbors to a one-day Pic-Nic to introduce the Patrons of Husbandry organization for farm and rural families.  With the exception of 1943, the Fair has been held every year since.

Demographics

At the 2010 census there were 1,265 people, 548 households, and 372 families residing in the borough. The population density was 2,054.2 people per square mile (793.6/km²). There were 574 housing units at an average density of 932.9 per square mile (360.1/km²). The racial makeup of the borough was 99.0% White, 0.1% Black or African American, 0.1% Native American, 0.2% Asian, 0.1% other, and 0.5% from two or more races.
There were 548 households, 26.6% had children under the age of 18 living with them, 56.0% were married couples living together, 3.3% had a male householder with no wife present, 8.6% had a female householder with no husband present, and 32.1% were non-families. 27.7% of households were made up of individuals, and 10.8% were one person aged 65 or older. The average household size was 2.31 and the average family size was 2.81.

In the borough the population was spread out, with 20.1% under the age of 18, 6.7% from 18 to 24, 26.2% from 25 to 44, 26.0% from 45 to 64, and 21.0% 65 or older. The median age was 43 years. For every 100 females there were 88.2 males. For every 100 females age 18 and over, there were 87.6 males.

The median household income was $50,556 and the median family income  was $64,141.  The per capita income for the borough was $25,298. About 4.7% of families and 6.0% of the population were below the poverty line, including 11.9% of those under age 18 and 1.9% of those age 65 or over.

References

External links

Centre Hall, Pa - Community Site
Grange Fair - Centre County Grange Encampment and Fair, Centre Hall, PA

Populated places established in 1847
Boroughs in Centre County, Pennsylvania
1847 establishments in Pennsylvania